Fred Garrigus Holloway (1898-1988) was an American bishop of The Methodist Church, elected in 1960. He also served as president of Western Maryland College (1935–47) and Drew University (1948–60).

Education
Holloway graduated in 1918 from Western Maryland College (now renamed McDaniel College), then earned a B.D. from Drew University in 1921.

Prior to his election to the Episcopacy, he was involved in education.  He was Professor of Biblical Languages and President of Westminster Theological Seminary.  He was also President (1935–47) of Western Maryland College, Westminster, Maryland.

He became Dean of the Drew Theological Seminary, Drew University, Madison, New Jersey in 1947. Just one year later he was offered the Presidency of the University upon the retirement of President Arlo Ayres Brown. As the seventh President of Drew from 1948–60, renovating and rebuilding the antiquated campus became his greatest legacy. New buildings, such as the Baldwin Gymnasium and many dormitories, were completed under his leadership. A graduate study curriculum was also instituted. Upon his election to the Episcopacy, Bishop Holloway left the university for his new role, and was assigned to West Virginia.

See also
List of bishops of the United Methodist Church

References
 Biographical Notes: Presidents and Key Figures in the History of Drew University (Drew Univ. Library) 

1898 births
1988 deaths
20th-century American educators
American religion academics
Heads of universities and colleges in the United States
American biblical scholars
Bishops of The Methodist Church (USA)
Seminary academics
Presidents of United Methodist seminaries
Drew University alumni
American university and college faculty deans